Gričice (in older sources also Gričica) is a former settlement in the Municipality of Semič in southern Slovenia. The area is part of the traditional region of Lower Carniola and is now included in the Southeast Slovenia Statistical Region. Its territory is now part of the village of Komarna Vas.

History
Gričice was a Gottschee German village. In 1931 it had 10 houses. The original inhabitants were expelled in the fall of 1941. Italian troops burned the village in the summer of 1942 during the Rog Offensive. In recent years a large number of vacation houses and self-catering accommodations have been built at Gričice to serve the Bela ski center.

References

External links
Gričice on Geopedia
Pre–World War II list of oeconyms and family names in Gričice

Former populated places in the Municipality of Semič